Hoseynabad-e Sar Jangal (also Romanized as Ḩoseynābād-e Sar Jangal and Hosein Abad Sar Jangal) is a village in Chahdegal Rural District, Negin Kavir District, Fahraj County, Kerman Province, Iran. At the 2006 census, its population was 315, in 67 families.

References 

Populated places in Fahraj County